Toni Rose Gayda (born August 30, 1958) is a Filipina television personality and actress. She is the daughter of the former Philippine National Red Cross governor, public servant and movie star Rosa Rosal, and American pilot Walter Gayda. She is of Filipino, Egyptian, French and American descent.

Gayda, alongside Richard Reynoso, is currently a host of A Song Of Praise Music Festival on UNTV, the only gospel music television program in the Philippines.

Filmography

Television

Film

References

External links

1958 births
Living people
Filipino people of Egyptian descent
Filipino people of French descent
Filipino people of American descent
Actresses from Manila
Filipino television variety show hosts
GMA Network personalities